Seán Levis (born 1981) is an Irish former Gaelic footballer who played for club side Muintir Bháire, at divisional level with Carbery and at inter-county level with the Cork senior football team. He usually lined out as a defender.

Career
Levis first came to Gaelic football prominence with the Muintir Bháire club in West Cork, with whom he won a County Junior B Championship in 2003. He also secured inclusion on the Carbery divisional team and was a member of the 2004 County Senior Championship-winning team. Levis first played for Cork at minor level. He won an All-Ireland Junior Championship in 2001. Levis subsequently progressed onto the Cork senior team and won two Munster Championship medals and was a substitute when Cork were beaten by Kerry in the 2007 All-Ireland final.

Honours
Muintir Bháire
Cork Junior B Football Championship: 2003

Carbery
Cork Senior Football Championship: 2004

Cork
Munster Senior Football Championship: 2002, 2006
All-Ireland Junior Football Championship: 2001
Munster Junior Football Championship: 2001

References

1981 births
Living people
Muintir Bháire Gaelic footballers
Carbery Gaelic footballers
Cork inter-county Gaelic footballers